Grecìa Salentina (Griko for "Salentine Greece") is an area in the peninsula of Salento in southern Italy, near the town of Lecce which is inhabited by the Griko people, an ethnic Greek minority in southern Italy who speak Griko, a variant of Greek.

Overview
The Union of the Towns of Grecìa Salentina (Unione dei Comuni della Grecìa Salentina) consists of eleven towns and forms part of the province of Lecce in the administrative area of Apulia (Puglia), and was founded by the Griko population in 1966. The purpose of this union was to promote the knowledge of Griko and preserve its culture, by organizing research at the university, teaching the language at schools and publishing books and poetry in the endangered dialect.

The following towns are members of the Union: Calimera, Martano, Castrignano dei Greci, Corigliano d'Otranto, Melpignano, Soleto, Sternatia, Zollino, Martignano, Carpignano Salentino and Cutrofiano. The towns of Carpignano Salentino and Cutrofiano joined the Union in 2007, though the inhabitants of these two towns have not spoken their original Greek dialect called griko for two centuries.

Demographics

Source:

See also
 Griko people
 Magna Graecia
 Catepanate of Italy

References

External links
 Grecia Salentina union website 

 
Greek-speaking countries and territories